The 1985 North Carolina Tar Heels football team represented the University of North Carolina at Chapel Hill during the 1985 NCAA Division I-A football season. The Tar Heels were led by eighth-year head coach Dick Crum and played their home games at Kenan Memorial Stadium in Chapel Hill, North Carolina. They competed as members of the Atlantic Coast Conference, finishing in fifth.

Schedule

Game summaries

LSU

References

North Carolina
North Carolina Tar Heels football seasons
North Carolina Tar Heels football